Tutupaca is a volcano in the region of Tacna in Peru. It is part of the Peruvian segment of the Central Volcanic Zone, one of several volcanic belts in the Andes. Tutupaca consists of three overlapping volcanoes formed by lava flows and lava domes made out of andesite and dacite, which grew on top of older volcanic rocks.

Several volcanoes in Peru have been active in recent times, including Tutupaca. Their volcanism is caused by the subduction of the Nazca Plate beneath the South America Plate. One of these volcanoes collapsed in historical time, probably in 1802, generating a large debris avalanche with a volume likely exceeding  and a pyroclastic flow. The associated eruption was among the largest in Peru for which there are historical records. The volcano became active about 700,000 years ago, and activity continued into the Holocene, but whether there were historical eruptions was initially unclear; some eruptions were instead attributed to the less eroded Yucamane volcano. The Peruvian government plans to monitor the volcano for future activity. Tutupaca features geothermal manifestations with fumaroles and hot springs.

Oral tradition 

The people in Candarave considered Tutupaca to be a "bad" mountain, while Yucamane was the "good" one; this may reflect that Tutupaca had recent volcanic eruptions. The Peruvian geographer Mateo Paz Soldán dedicated an ode to Tutupaca.

Geology and geomorphology 

Lake Suches lies north of the volcano, and two rivers flow nearby: the Callazas River, flowing eastward to the north of the volcano, and then southward past Tutupaca's eastern flank, and the Tacalaya River, which flows south along Tutupaca's western flank. The local climate is cold, and the terrain is stony, with little vegetation. During the wet season, the mountain is snow-covered, and meltwater from Tutupaca and other regional mountains is an important source of water for the rivers in the region. In contrast, the volcano itself is largely unaffected by human activity.

Tutupaca consists of two volcanic complexes: an older complex that is highly eroded, and two northerly peaks which formed more recently. The western peak is the highest summit of Tutupaca.

Cirques and moraines are also found on the western summit, and tephra layers extend west of the volcano. The older complex, which includes lava domes in the form of small hills on its southern part, was the source of ignimbrite that covers the western and southern parts of the volcano. Postglacial lava flows emanating from a vent located between the two peaks have been identified. Proglacial processes like frost shattering have altered young volcanic products.

Composition 

The older complex and western Tutupaca have erupted andesite and dacite, while eastern Tutupaca has only produced dacite. Trachyandesite and trachyte also occur. The volcanic rocks erupted during the Holocene define a potassium-rich calc-alkaline suite. Dacites from eastern Tutupaca contain amphibole, apatite, biotite, clinopyroxene, iron-titanium oxides, orthopyroxene, plagioclase, quartz, and sphene. Mafic rock fragments are rarely found embedded in Tutupaca rocks. The basal volcanic rocks have suffered hydrothermal alteration, forming clays. Elemental sulfur deposits have been identified at Tutupaca and a 1996 map of the volcano shows a sulfur mine on its southeastern flank.

Sector collapse 

The deposit is mostly found within glacial valleys and is interlaid by the Paipatja pyroclastic flow which divides the debris into two units. The pyroclastic flow reaches both Lake Suches north of the volcano and the Callazas River east of it.

The two units of the debris avalanche are distinguished by their appearance. Such ridges have been observed in other collapse deposits such as at Shiveluch volcano in Russia, and have been explained by sorting processes that take place within granular flows. The differences between the two units appear to be because the first unit was formed from the basal part of Tutupaca, while the second unit was formed by the more recent lava domes of the eastern volcano and formed a granular flow.

The collapse possibly started in the hydrothermal system of the volcano and progressed to affect a growing lava dome, with a total volume probably exceeding . This collapse was not the first in the history of Tutupaca: collapses on the southeast-east flanks of the volcano occurred 6,0007,500 years ago and delivered debris through glacial valleys on the eastern and southeastern side of the volcano, and on the western side of the volcano a collapse took place before 17,00025,000 years ago. Such large collapses of volcanoes took place in historical time at Mount Bandai in 1888 and Mount St. Helens in 1980; they can produce large avalanches of debris.

Geologic context 

Off the coast of Peru, the Nazca Plate subducts at  beneath the South America Plate, causing volcanism in three of the four volcanic belts in the Andes, including the Central Volcanic Zone where Tutupaca is located. Other Peruvian volcanoes include Sara Sara, Solimana, Coropuna, the Andagua volcanic field, AmpatoSabancayaHualca Hualca, Chachani, El Misti, Ubinas, Huaynaputina, Ticsani, Yucamane, Purupuruni and Casiri. During historical times, major eruptions took place in Peru at El Misti 2,000 years ago and at Huaynaputina in 1600, the latter of which claimed 1,500 fatalities and disrupted the climate of Earth.

The basement of the region consists of folded Mesozoic sediments, and Cenozoic volcanic and sedimentary cover which overlies the Mesozoic rocks. There are many tectonic lineaments and faults which were active in the Tertiary; one of these crosses Tutupaca from north to south, and others influence the positions of geothermal features. The Huaylillas ignimbrite complex underlies some of the volcanic centres, which include a first set of eroded volcanoes that were active between 8.4–5 and 4–2 million years ago, principally erupting lava flows. These were followed by a second set of volcanoes which were also mainly active with lava flows, such as Casiri, Tutupaca, and Yucamane. A third phase formed dacitic lava domes such as Purupuruni about 100,000 years ago. Other, older stratovolcanoes are found at Tutupaca and are heavily eroded by glaciers.

Climate and vegetation 

Most of the volcanoes in the Central Volcanic Zone are located at over  elevation where the climate is cold with frequent freezes. Wetlands, called bofedales, display a diverse plant life. Above  elevation plant life diminishes and in 20032012 by  there was perpetual snow.

Eruption history 

The oldest volcanic rocks of Tutupaca are 1,135,000 ± 17,000 years old. The older complex was active at first with lava flows and then with a major explosive eruption; a pumice-and-ash flow forms the "Callazas" deposit and may have been produced either by the older complex or by western Tutupaca. A long hiatus separated the activity of the older complex from that of western and eastern Tutupaca. The small lava domes on the older complex have been dated to 260,000 ± 200,000 while more recent domes are 33,000±5,000 years old. Volcanic activity continued into the Holocene, and the volcano is considered to be potentially active. Today, fumaroles occur on the summit of Tutupaca and seismic activity has been recorded.

There are reports of eruptions in 1780, 1787, 1802, 1862 and 1902, supported by dates obtained through radiocarbon dating showing there were eruptions during this period. Some authors believed that Yucamane volcano was a more likely source for these eruptions, but Samaniego 2015 et al. showed that Yucumane last erupted 3,000 years ago, implying that the reported eruptions, especially the 1802 and 1787 events, most likely occurred at Tutupaca.

The sector collapse of eastern Tutupaca was accompanied by an eruption that was among the largest in Peruvian history, reaching a volcanic explosivity index of 3 or 4. The collapse has been dated to 1731–1802 with high probability and is thought to be associated with the 1802 eruption. The eruption was probably triggered by the entry of fresh, hot magma into a dacitic magma chamber. Shortly before the collapse, a pyroclastic flow erupted from the volcano probably as a consequence of the collapse of a lava dome. The previous eruption may have destabilized the volcano and triggered the main collapse, which also generated the Paipatja pyroclastic flow. The area was thinly inhabited at the time, and thus the impact of the eruption was small.

Hazards 

Based on the history of Tutupaca, a future eruption can be envisaged where renewed activity causes another collapse of the volcano. In this case, about 8,000–10,000 people, as well as neighboring geothermal power and mining infrastructure, would be in danger. Several small towns, diversion dams, irrigation canals, and the two roads IloDesaguadero and TacnaTarataCandarave would also be vulnerable. Other dangers are ballistic rocks, pyroclastic flows, scoria avalanches, ash and pumice rains, volcanic gas and lahars. Tutupaca along with Ubinas and Huaynaputina is one of the three volcanoes in Peru to have produced large explosive eruptions.

The Peruvian Instituto Geológico, Minero y Metalúrgico (INGEMMET) has published a volcano hazard map for Tutupaca. In 2017, Tutupaca was identified as one of the volcanoes to be monitored by the future Peruvian Southern Volcano Observatory. This would entail surveillance of earthquake activity, changes in the composition of fumarole gases and deformation of the volcanoes, and real-time video. This project, budgeted to cost 18,500,000 Peruvian sols ( US dollars) and involves the construction of thirty monitoring stations and the main observatory in the Sachaca District, became active in 2019. Publication of regular activity reports began in May 2019. The volcano is classified as "moderately dangerous".

Geothermal activity 

The fields feature fumaroles, geysers, mud pots and occurrences of sulfur, both solid and in the form of hydrogen sulfide gas, as well as siliceous sinter and travertine deposits. Hot springs at the foot of the Tutupaca volcano discharge water into the rivers.

Tutupaca has been mentioned as a potential site for geothermal power generation. In 2013, Canada's Alterra Power and the Philippine Energy Development Corporation developed a joint venture to work on a geothermal prospect at Tutupaca, although work at Tutupaca had not begun by October 2014.

Notes

References

Sources

External links 
 Evolución vulcanológica y magmática del edificio reciente del complejo volcánico Tutupaca (Tacna). Tesis de ingeniería, Universidad Nacional de San Agustín de Arequipa, 112 p. Manrique,N. (2013)
 Origin and dynamics of volcanic debris avalanches : surface structure analysis of Tutupaca volcano
 Una gran erupción del volcán Tutupaca (Tacna) ocurrida hace approximadamente 200 años AP: Implicaciones para la evaluación de la amenaza

Stratovolcanoes of Peru
Landforms of Tacna Region
Andean Volcanic Belt
Mountains of Peru
Mountains of Tacna Region
Miocene stratovolcanoes
Pliocene stratovolcanoes
Miocene South America
Neogene South America
Five-thousanders of the Andes